Mohammad Reza Khalatbari (born 14 September 1983) is an Iranian international football player who currently plays for Aluminium. He can play as attacking midfielder, winger and forward.

Club career

Early years
Khalatbari began his career with Shamoushak's youth teams and joined Aboumoslem in the summer of 2004. He helped Aboumoslem reach the Hazfi Cup final where they lost to Saba Qom on penalties.

Zob Ahan
After two years with Aboumoslem, in July 2006, he signed for Zob Ahan, where he played important matches and led his team to win the Hazfi Cup in June 2009.
During the Summer of 2009, Khalatbari had a trial at FC Köln, however the manager (Zvonimir Soldo) stated that Khalatbari was "lacking physical strength" and that "he might be a problem in Germany",. He returned after his failed trial to become one of the most influential players in league and ACL in the 2009–10 season, where Zob Ahan reached the Champions League final for the first time in club history.

Al Gharrafa
He left Zob Ahan in June 2011 and signed a contract with Al Gharrafa Qatar. After an unsuccessful half-season at Al-Gharrafa, Khalatbari left the club in the winter transfer window.

Al Ain F.C.
In early 2012, he was moved to Al Ain F.C.,A successful loan from Al Gharafa He Scored 3 goals in 17 caps for Al Ain F.C.

Sepahan and Ajman

On 10 July 2012, he joined Iranian champion Sepahan. He won the Hazfi Cup with Sepahan and became the league's top assistant player with 13 assists. He was also one of the league's top scorers with 14 league goals. Khalatbari had one of the best years in hs career with 17 goals in 45 appearances in all competitions. At the end of 2012–13 season, he moved to Ajman but the transfer was canceled after the renaming of UAE Pro League to UAE Arabian Gulf League.

Persepolis

On 1 September 2013, Persepolis and Ajman reached an agreement with a fee around $800,000 and he joined Persepolis with a two-year contract. He made his debut in the Tehran derby match against Esteghlal. His first goal came when he scored a penalty kick in a match against Gostaresh Foolad. His six league goals helped Persepolis to a second-place league finish and a berth in the Asian Champions League. At the end of season, while he had financial problems with Persepolis, he paid one third of Ajman's debt (fee around $250,000) and skip his debts (fee around 3,400 million Rials). on 15 July 2014, Persepolis released him.

Return to Sepahan

On 15 July 2014, Khalatbari returned to Sepahan, signing a two-year contract.

Club career statistics

Assists

International career

Khalatbari plays as both winger and attacking midfielder for Iran. He's played in the WAFF Championships, 2010 World Cup qualifiers and 2011 Asian Cup qualifiers. He played an important role in securing Iran's spot in the 2014 FIFA World Cup under manager Carlos Queiroz. He was selected in Iran's 30-man provisional squad for the 2014 FIFA World Cup by Carlos Queiroz. However, Khalatbari did not make in the final 23-man squad.

International goals
Scores and results list Iran's goal tally first.

Attributes
Khalatbari is best known for his technical skill and fast pace on the ball, his vision, and his shooting capabilities.

Honours

Club
Abomooslem
Hazfi Cup: 2004–05 (Runner-up)

Zob Ahan
AFC Champions League: 2010 (Runner-up)
Iran Pro League: 2008–09 (Runner-up), 2009–10 (Runner-up)
Hazfi Cup: 2008–09

Al Ain FC
 2012–13 UAE Pro League UAE Pro League Winner

Sepahan
Iran Pro League (1): 2014–15
Hazfi Cup: 2012–13

Persepolis
Iran Pro League: 2013–14 (Runner-up)

Foolad
Iranian Super Cup: 2021

Country
WAFF Championship: 2008

Individual
Iran Pro League top goal assistant: 2008–09, 2012–13

References

External links

 Mohammad Reza Khalatbari at PersianLeague.com

1983 births
Living people
Iranian footballers
Zob Ahan Esfahan F.C. players
Shamoushak Noshahr players
F.C. Aboomoslem players
2011 AFC Asian Cup players
Persian Gulf Pro League players
Qatar Stars League players
Al-Wasl F.C. players
Ajman Club players
Al-Gharafa SC players
Iranian expatriate footballers
Expatriate footballers in the United Arab Emirates
Iranian expatriate sportspeople in the United Arab Emirates
Iran international footballers
Mazandarani people
UAE Pro League players
Sportspeople from Mazandaran province
Association football wingers
Gostaresh Foulad F.C. players
People from Ramsar, Mazandaran
Foolad FC players